E.N.G. is a Canadian television drama, following the staff of a fictional Toronto television news station. The show aired on CTV from 1989 to 1994. The series ran for 96 episodes, produced by the Alliance Entertainment Corporation.

Plot 
"E.N.G." stands for electronic news-gathering. The show is led by Anne Hildebrandt (Sara Botsford), the senior executive producer of the news broadcasts on fictional Toronto television station, CTLS channel 10. Hildebrandt is bright, assertive and also having a clandestine affair with star cameraman Jake Antonelli (Mark Humphrey). Jake is younger and married to Martha with two children; after Jake and Martha divorce, son Jeff lives with Jake, while their daughter lives with her mother.

Mike Fennell (Art Hindle) is the station's newly-appointed news director, taking a position Anne had been expecting to receive. Mike aims to improve ratings of the newscasts and his coverage philosophy is in obvious conflict with Anne's. Anne and Mike find common ground and later become romantically involved. Mike has a troubled teenage daughter named Carrie from his previous marriage; Carrie lives in Vancouver.

Other members of the CTLS staff include Jane Oliver, the station's weathercaster; Seth Miller, who worries about being pushed into retirement due to his age; Kyle Copeland, the station's general manager who sometimes clashes with both Anne and Mike; Bobbi Katz, another camera person; J.C. Callahan, the station's alcoholic and cranky assignment editor, who later is left requiring a wheelchair by an accident; Marge Atherton, the station's video editor, who is very motherly and offers co-workers advice, and a compassionate shoulder to lean on; Dan Watson, a smarmy senior reporter who occasionally puts his foot in his mouth. Janice Roberts, a news researcher, joins channel 10 the same day Mike does. Janice later commits suicide after becoming too emotionally involved in a story. Bruce Foreman is a devious and scheming assistant assignment editor; Eric "Mac" MacFarlane is the newscast's openly-gay floor manager; Terri Morgan, a scheming reporter who tends to be very cut-throat. Victor Garber has a recurring role as  tycoon Adam Hirsch, who owned CTLS during the final three seasons.

At the end of the series, Anne and Mike try to balance their personal and professional lives, when it is revealed that CTLS is going from a hard news format to a lifestyles format. Mike receives a new job offer in Japan, and invites Anne to go with him. After making peace with Jake, who urged her to have a life with Mike, Anne decides to accept his offer, although she would not be permitted to work, by Japanese law. In the final episode, "The Cutting Edge", Clarke Roberts (Janice's brother) dares Anne to get back in the trenches and help him with a hard news story. She does, finding how much she loves the excitement. She is offered a job at another news station, by the station owner (Simon MacCorkindale). After talking to Mike, they decide they want different things. Mike goes to Japan to begin his new job. Anne is last seen standing outside the building where her new job, as station manager will begin.

Episodes

Season 1 (1989–90)

Season 2 (1990–91)

Season 3 (1991–92)

Season 4 (1992–93)

Season 5 (1993–94)

Main cast
Anne Hildebrandt — Sara Botsford
Jake Antonelli — Mark Humphrey
Mike Fennell — Art Hindle
Eric MacFarlane — Jonathan Welsh
J.C. Callahan — Neil Dainard
Dan Watson — Karl Pruner
Terri Morgan — Cynthia Belliveau
Seth Miller — James Millington
Bobbi Katz — Mary Beth Rubens
Kyle Copeland — George R. Robertson
Jane Oliver — Sherry Miller
Marge Atherton — Theresa Tova
Clarke Roberts — Clark Johnson
Janice Roberts — Rachael Crawford
Kelly Longstreet — Lisa LaCroix
Adam Hirsch — Victor Garber

Reception

Jim Leach argues that E.N.G. attempted to "negotiate between the traditions of Canadian television and formulas of the popular American programs that dominate CITV's schedule." He says that the series was often compared with the Canadian Broadcasting Company's Street Legal, covering the "personal and professional entanglements" of a law office". Both of these show were in turn compared to Hill Street Blues and LA Law. Unlike much of Canadian drama which had been produced by public networks, Leach reflects that "the success of E.N.G. raised hopes that the private networks would offer more support to Canadian producers."

The show, according to Leach, followed a tradition of documentary realism and social responsibility. However, he argues, the formula owes more to "melodramatic structures" of daytime soap operas rather than the "Canadian suspicion of 'crisis structures'".

The show won ten Gemini Awards, including best dramatic programming series. Broadcast historian Michael Nolan observes that the low was "critically acclaimed" yet "lost money every time it was aired, an illustration of how expensive the genre of Canadian dramatic programming was to produce in an increasingly fragmented television market."

International broadcasts
E.N.G. was also screened in the United Kingdom on Channel 4, which aired the first four seasons but chose not to present the fifth and final season. In the United States, the show aired in syndication. It also aired on Lifetime in the United States during the 1990-91 season, originally in the 7 PM (EST) slot, but due to poor ratings, was moved to late nights after only several weeks. In Spain the series aired on Antena 3TV dubbed into Spanish and with the title "E.N.G. Reporteros" in a weekday 530pm slot. The channel screened a great number of episodes but never completed the entire run. The series has never been repeated on Spanish TV. In Macedonia it aired on the national MRT. In South Africa it aired on the SABC2 channel.

References

External links

 
  E.N.G. Cast Photo Link at the Broadcast History Site
  E.N.G. at Museum TV Site
  E.N.G. at TV Archive Site
  E.N.G. Episode Guide at TV Archive Site

CTV Television Network original programming
Gemini and Canadian Screen Award for Best Drama Series winners
1989 Canadian television series debuts
1994 Canadian television series endings
Canadian television soap operas
Television series about journalism
Television shows filmed in Toronto
Television shows set in Toronto
Television series about television
Television series by Alliance Atlantis
1980s Canadian drama television series
1990s Canadian drama television series